Dean is a village and an unincorporated community  within Dean Township in Cambria County, Pennsylvania, United States. It is part of the Johnstown, Pennsylvania Metropolitan Statistical Area.

References

Unincorporated communities in Cambria County, Pennsylvania
Unincorporated communities in Pennsylvania